PhDr. Leo Pavlát (9 October 1950 in Prague) is a Czech Jewish journalist, writer and diplomat. Since 1994, he is the director of the Jewish Museum in Prague.

Work

Books 
 Tajemství knihy (1982)

References

External links
 the Jewish Museum in Prague: A word from the Director
 Meet … Director of the Jewish Museum in Prague Leo Pavlát - Interview
 David Fábry: Interview s Leo Pavlátem pro www.shekel.cz, 5.5.2011

1950 births
Writers from Prague
Living people
Czech Jews
Museum directors